SCMO may refer to:
 Scottish Catholic Media Office
 Subsidiary Communications Multiplex Operation, a subcarrier on a broadcasting station
 Supply Chain Management Outsource, an advisory firm specialized in logistics